Robbery is the fifth studio album by American singer-songwriter Teena Marie, released in September 18, 1983. It is her first album for Epic Records, following her acrimonious departure from Motown the previous year. The album was written and produced by Marie herself and features contributions from Patrice Rushen, Paulinho da Costa, and Steve Ferrone among others. However, the album did not repeat the success of her last Motown release It Must Be Magic (1981) stalling at number 13 on the Black Albums chart and only reaching number 119 on the Billboard Albums chart.

The album placed three singles on the US Black Singles chart" "Fix It", peaking at #21, followed by "Midnight Magnet" (#31) and "Dear Lover" (#77).

In 2012, the album was re-released in a remastered and expanded CD edition containing four additional tracks.

Cassanova Brown
Included on this album is the infamous song, "Cassanova Brown". After meeting Rick James in the '70s and being signed to the same label, James and Marie began a relationship, first professional, progressing (according to Marie) to a romantic one, and finally leading to an engagement. Although James himself denied ever having a romantic involvement with Marie, she said they were engaged for a few weeks. When James' alleged infidelities came to light, Marie realized that she herself was a mistress; James had a girlfriend, Alfie Davidson, who would later substantiate that James and Marie were once an item, while she was his girlfriend. After the breakup, their relationship waned to a tumultuous friendship. The lyrics are very thinly veiled in her contempt for the situation.

Track listing
All songs written by Teena Marie.

"Robbery" - 5:23
"Playboy" - 5:23
"Shadow Boxing" - 6:49
"Midnight Magnet" - 6:02
"Fix It" - 4:44
"Ask Your Momma" - 5:25
"Dear Lover" - 5:18
"Stop the World" - 4:16
"Cassanova Brown" - 5:58
Bonus tracks - 2012 SoulMusic reissue
"Playboy" (US 12" Remix) - 5:51 (Expanded edition)
"Fix It" (US 12" Remix) - 6:30 (Expanded edition)
"Fix It" (Instrumental)(US 12" Remix) - 8:16 (Expanded edition)
"Midnight Magnet" (US 12" Instrumental) - 6:00 (Expanded edition)

Personnel
Credits for Robbery adapted from Allmusic

Keith Alexander - guitar
James Allen- clapping, backing vocals
Steven Berkowitz - A&R
Harry Bluestone - concertmaster
John A. Bokowski, Jr. - Fender Rhodes, piano, synthesizer
Anthony Boyce - backing vocals
Stacey Boyle - A&R, artist coordination
Anthony Allan Brockert - monologue
Robert Brooks - engineer, mixing
Nick Brown - guitar
Nick Ceroli - drums
Brian Chin - liner notes
Stanley Clarke - upright bass
Todd Cochran - synthesizer
Paulinho Da Costa - percussion
Nathan East - bass, synthesizer bass
Charles Fearing - guitar
Steve Ferrone - drums
Chuck Findley - trumpet
Howard Fritzson - art direction
Lynn Goldsmith - photography
Gary Grant - trumpet
Jo Hay - design
Mickey Hearn - monologue
Marlo Henderson - guitar
Gary Herbig - tenor saxophone 
Paul Hines - drums
Jeremy Holiday - A&R, artist coordination
Dick Hyde - trombone
Anthony Jackson - bass
Paul Jackson Jr. - guitar, soloist
Car Johnson - backing vocals
Abraham Laboriel - bass
Ricky Lawson - drums
Daniel LeMelle - saxophone, soloist
 
Charles Loper - trombone
Teena Marie - arranger, horn arrangements, monologue, rhythm arrangements, string arrangements, synthesizer, synthesizer arrangements, vocal arrangement, backing vocals
Patti Matheny - A&R, artist coordination
Fred Mirza - horn arrangements, string arrangements
Joy Gilbert Monfried - project director
Eric O'Neal - synthesizer, synthesizer arrangements
Joseph M. Palmaccio - mastering
Recco Philmore - backing vocals
Darryl Phinnessee - backing vocals
Greg Poree - acoustic guitar
Paul Riser - conductor, horn arrangements, string arrangements, string conductor
John Robinson - drums, Simmons drums
Patrice Rushen - synthesizer
Leo Sacks - reissue producer
Darren Salmieri - A&R, artist coordination
Ron Slenzak - cover photo, photography
Dianne Spoto - packaging manager
Sweet Baby Note - backing vocals
Carmen Twillie - backing vocals
Ernie Watts - alto saxophone 
Nathan Watts - bass, rhythm arrangements
Dwayne Wedlaw - synthesizer arrangements
Julia Tillman Waters - backing vocals
Maxine Willard Waters - backing vocals

References

Teena Marie albums
1983 albums
Albums arranged by Paul Riser
Epic Records albums